Mathamangalam or M.M.Bazar is a small town in Kannur district of Kerala state, India. Mathamagalam is a main trading centre, especially for hill products.

Location
Mathamangalam is 8.5 kilometers from Pilathara junction on the National Highway-66. It is 14 km from Payyanur and 39 km from Kannur, the district headquarters.

Education
College of Engineering and Technology.

Post Office
There is a post office in the village and it is officially called Mathamangalam Bazar or M.M.Bazar. The pincode is 670306.

Administration
Mathamangalam is part of Eramam-Kuttoor panchayat.

See also
 Kadannappally
 Vellora
 Olayampadi
 Pilathara
 Pariyaram
 Eramam

References

Villages near Payyanur